Bryan Albert Campbell (born March 27, 1944) is a Canadian former professional ice hockey forward who played 260 games in the National Hockey League and 433 games in the World Hockey Association between 1967 and 1978. He played for the Los Angeles Kings, Chicago Black Hawks, Vancouver Blazers, Cincinnati Stingers, Indianapolis Racers, and Edmonton Oilers. He retired to Boca Raton, Florida, with his wife Jo-anne.

Career statistics

Regular season and playoffs

References

External links
 

1944 births
Living people
Canadian ice hockey centres
Chicago Blackhawks players
Cincinnati Stingers players
Cincinnati Wings players
Edmonton Oil Kings (WCHL) players
Edmonton Oilers (WHA) players
Hamilton Red Wings (OHA) players
Ice hockey people from Ontario
Indianapolis Racers players
Los Angeles Kings players
Philadelphia Blazers players
Sportspeople from Greater Sudbury
Vancouver Blazers players